Ambros Uchtenhagen (23 August 1928 - 10 September 2022) was a Swiss psychiatrist. He was the widower of politician Lilian Uchtenhagen, who died in 2016. He served as a professor at the University of Zürich.

References

1928 births
2022 deaths
Swiss psychiatrists
Academic staff of the University of Zurich
People from Basel-Stadt